The Catholic Church in Mauritius is part of the worldwide Catholic Church, under the spiritual leadership of the Pope in Rome.

There are just over 300,000 Catholics in Mauritius, about a quarter of the total population.  The country is divided into two territorial jurisdictions:
 Port-Louis
 Vicariate Apostolic of Rodrigues

Catholicism by district

Catholicism by populated places
List of places in Mauritius with a Roman Catholic population of at least 50.0% of the total population.

See also
 Christianity in Mauritius
List of saints from Africa

External links
 http://www.catholic-hierarchy.org/country/mu.html

 
Mauritius
Mauritius